Elizabeth "Lucy" Cousins is a British author and illustrator of children's books. She is best known for her books featuring Maisy Mouse, referred to as the Maisy Series published from the 1990s onwards, from which the TV series Maisy was created in 1999.

Early life and education 
Cousins, whose parents were also artists, was interested in children's books from an early age. But it took until the end of six years in art college for her to decide that she wanted to create children's books. Cousins received BA Honours in graphic design from the Faculty of Arts and Architecture at Brighton Polytechnic. She then attended the Royal College of Art, where she met artist Quentin Blake, who encouraged her work. She developed her sense of design and colour at the Royal College of Art.

Work 
Cousins' books are aimed at preschool-aged children and younger or older.

Her work, especially the character of Maisy Mouse, is a successful publishing brand, with books printed in 27 different languages and over 27 million copies of her books in print. The series is known as the Maisy Series.

Apart from the Maisy books, Cousins has also published other children's books, such as Jazzy in the Jungle (2002) and one about Noah's Ark.

Recognition
Her board books, designed especially for toddlers, are considered among the best, according to Horn Book Magazine.

The Carnegie Library listed Maisy's First Colors as a 2013 pick for their Best Books for Babies list.

Cousins' character, Maisy, was featured on a postage stamp published by the U.S. Postal Service in their 2006 Favorite Children's Book Animals Series.

Cousins won a Booktrust Best Book Award in 2014 for Peck, Peck, Peck.

She received Mathical Honors for Count with Maisy, Cheep, Cheep, Cheep!.

Bibliography

References 

Living people
Alumni of the Royal College of Art
Alumni of the University of Brighton
English cartoonists
British women cartoonists
British women illustrators
English children's book illustrators
English children's writers
20th-century English women writers
20th-century English writers
21st-century English women writers
Year of birth missing (living people)